Pauline Johnson (3 November 1899 – 13 February 1947) was an English film actress. She was a leading lady of British films during the silent era.

She was born Katherine Johnson in Newcastle upon Tyne, Northumberland, England and died in Dorset, England in 1947.

Partial filmography
 The Imperfect Lover (1921)
 Class and No Class (1921)
 A Sailor Tramp (1922)
 Wanted, a Boy (1924)
 One of the Best (1927)
 The Hellcat (1928)
 What Next? (1928)
 The Flying Scotsman (1929)
 The Wrecker (1929)
 Wait and See (1929)
 Little Miss London (1929)
 Would You Believe It! (1929)

References

External links

1899 births
1947 deaths
English film actresses
Actresses from Newcastle upon Tyne
English silent film actresses
20th-century English actresses